The Skug River, said to be named either for the Native American word Skug, meaning Snake, or a misspelling of Skunk River, is a  river in North Andover, Andover, and North Reading, Massachusetts that constitutes part of the Ipswich River watershed.

The river arises from wetlands just south of Boston Hill in the Harold Parker State Forest, and flows mainly southwest to empty into Martin's Pond in North Reading. From there, Martin's Brook carries its waters onwards to the Ipswich River.

The river was dammed over 200 years ago for a sawmill and grist mill. Although the dam has since disappeared, the large stone walls of its millrace can still be seen in the Harold Parker State Forest and Andover Village Improvement Society Skug River Reservation, as can the old Jenkins Soapstone Quarry abutting the river.

References 

 A.V.I.S. Skug River Reservation

Rivers of Essex County, Massachusetts
Rivers of Middlesex County, Massachusetts
Rivers of Massachusetts